Richard B. Wells (born 1953) is a Professor Emeritus at the University of Idaho in Moscow, Idaho.  From 2006 until his retirement in 2013, he held concurrent appointments as Professor of Electrical and Computer Engineering, Professor of Neuroscience, Adjunct Professor of Philosophy, and Adjunct Professor of Materials Science & Engineering.  He was named as Senior Member of the Institute of Electrical and Electronics Engineers in 2001.

Early life and education
Wells holds a B.S. degree in Electrical Engineering from Iowa State University in Ames, Iowa where he graduated with distinction in May 1975. He received his M.S. in Electrical Engineering in May 1979 from Stanford University and his Ph.D. in Electrical Engineering in May 1985 from the University of Idaho.

Textbooks

References

External links
Richard B Wells page at the University of Idaho

20th-century American engineers
University of Idaho faculty
1953 births
Electrical and computer engineering
American electrical engineers
Senior Members of the IEEE
Stanford University School of Engineering alumni
Iowa State University alumni
University of Idaho alumni
People from Maquoketa, Iowa
Hewlett-Packard people
University of Washington faculty
Living people